The Bishop of Derby is the Ordinary of the Church of England Diocese of Derby in the Province of Canterbury.

The diocese was formed from part of the Diocese of Southwell in 1927 under George V and roughly covers the county of Derbyshire. Before this time however there had been two bishops suffragan of Derby whilst the town was still within the Diocese of Southwell.

The bishop's seat (cathedra) or see is located in the City of Derby at Derby Cathedral – formerly the parish church of All Saints, which was elevated to cathedral status in 1927. The bishop's residence is the Bishop's House, Duffield.

The current bishop is Libby Lane, since the confirmation on 11 February 2019 of her election.

List of bishops

Assistant bishops
Among those who have served as assistant bishops of the diocese have been:
19361937 (d.): Philip Crick, Vicar of Ashbourne and former Bishop of Rockhampton and of Ballarat
19371941 (d.): Edward Every, Rector of Egginton; retired Bishop of the Falkland Islands and of Argentina
19411953 (res.): Ronald O'Ferrall, Rector of Walton on Trent until 1944, Vicar of Repton and Foremark (1944–1947), Provost of Derby thereafter; former Bishop in Madagascar and later Assistant Bishop of Gloucester
1954–1962: George Sinker, Vicar of Bakewell and former Bishop in Nagpur
19621984 (d.): Tom Parfitt, Rector of Matlock with Tansley (until 1980) and former Bishop in Madagascar
19791980 (res.): George Briggs, assistant priest in Matlock with Tansley and former Bishop of The Seychelles

References

External links
Crockford's Clerical Directory - Listings

Derby
 
Bishops of Derby
Diocese of Derby